WLDN is an FM radio station owned by Synergy Media and is licensed to Ludington, Michigan. WLDN broadcasts from studios in Ludington, Michigan along with sister stations WKLA, WWMN, WKZC, WMLQ, and WWKR. It runs a news/talk/sports format and can be heard as far north as Copemish, Michigan, as far east as Reed City, Michigan, and as far south as Whitehall, Michigan. Under certain conditions, it can be heard in parts of northeastern Wisconsin and in Traverse City, Michigan. However, WLDN encounters heavy interference to the south from WFGR, which also broadcasts on 98.7 from Grand Rapids, Michigan.

History
WLDN received an original construction permit on October 18, 2011. At the time, the license was held by Lopester Broadcasting. Late in 2011, the CP was sold to Synergy Media, and the sale was consummated on January 25, 2012. In September 2012, WLDN started testing with a simulcast of sister station WMLQ, which already had (and still has) a translator in Ludington at 104.9 FM. WLDN started its current format in October, with its license being issued on October 17, 2012.

It is the Ludington-Manistee affiliate for Michigan State University sports and the Detroit Tigers Radio Network.

Current lineup

Weekdays
6am  9am: The Breakfast Beat (local show hosted by Jason Wilder and Dave Ohman)
9am  12pm: The Steve Gruber Show
12pm  1pm: Local News Hour with Steve Ruba
1pm  4pm: The Herd with Colin Cowherd
4pm  5pm: County Line Sports (local sports show hosted by Bill Downing)
5pm  6pm: Local News Hour with Kayla Lester
6pm  9pm: America Now with Andy Dean
9pm  1am: Fox Talk with Colmes/Gibson
1am  6am: The George Noory Show

Saturday
12am  4am: Michigan Morning
4am  5am: Financial Fitness
5am  6am: Michigan Morning
6am  7am: Travel Michigan
7am  10am: Mike Avery's Outdoors
10am  11am: Health and Wellness
11am  12pm: Greening of the Lakes
12pm  2pm: The Tom Sullivan Show
2pm  5pm: The Leo LaPorte Show
5pm  8pm: The Weekend
8pm  9pm: Travel Michigan
9pm  12am: The Gibson on Fox Show

Sunday
12am  4am: Michigan Morning
4am  5am: Unknown programming
5am  7am: The C.A.R. Show
7am  9am: Wild Michigan
9am  10am: As It Is Written
10am  12pm: The Jesus Christ Show
12pm  2pm: The Sullivan Show
2pm  5pm: The Leo LaPorte Show
5pm  8pm: Glenn Beck Weekends
8pm  9pm: Wild Michigan
9pm  12am: The Alan Colmes Show

External links

Radio stations established in 2012
News and talk radio stations in the United States
Oceana County, Michigan
LDN